Conor McCullough (born January 31, 1991) is an American hammer thrower. He is a two-time medalist (one gold, one silver) at the World Junior Championships. While competing for Chaminade College Preparatory School he set the US high school record at four contested hammer weights - 11 lb (263' 9"), 12 lb (260' 0"), 13.2 lb (248' 11") and 16 lb (219' 7"). He also set the record in the Indoor Weight Throw at 93' 3¼".  He set his personal best  using the senior implement on his final throw while winning the 2019 USA Outdoor Track and Field Championships.

Career
At the 2008 World Junior Championships in Athletics, McCullough won a silver medal behind compatriot Walter Henning in a personal best throw of 75.88 m (with a six-kilogram ball).  Two years later, after competing for Princeton University, at the 2010 World Junior Championships in Athletics, McCullough won gold with a distance of 80.79 m, a national junior and championship record. In 2012 McCullough qualified for the Olympic Trials; there he finished just out of the medals with a throw of 73.55, leaving him in the fourth place position.

His father, Connor McCullagh, competed in the hammer throw for Ireland and was in the 1984 and 1988 Olympics.

USC's Conor McCullough was granted a sixth year of eligibility by the NCAA and competed in both the indoor season, finishing second in the weight throw at the 2015 NCAA Division I Indoor Track and Field Championships and the outdoor season, winning the 2015 NCAA Division I Outdoor Track and Field Championships. McCullough began his career at Princeton University and enrolled at USC in 2014. He was hammer runner up in 76.09m (249-7) at 2015 USA Outdoor Track and Field Championships. In 2016 McCullough competed in the Olympic Games and again finished as the top american with a 16th place finish.

Personal bests

References

External links
 
 
 
 
 
 Conor McCullough - Men's Track and Field - Princeton University Athletics

1991 births
Living people
American male hammer throwers
Track and field athletes from California
Athletes (track and field) at the 2015 Pan American Games
World Athletics Championships athletes for the United States
Pan American Games bronze medalists for the United States
Athletes (track and field) at the 2016 Summer Olympics
Olympic track and field athletes of the United States
Pan American Games medalists in athletics (track and field)
USA Indoor Track and Field Championships winners
USA Outdoor Track and Field Championships winners
Medalists at the 2015 Pan American Games